Stamford Hill is a suburb of Durban, KwaZulu-Natal, South Africa. It is administered by the eThekwini Metropolitan Municipality and its postal code is 4001.

The suburb, located on the Indian Ocean coast, is non-residential and consists primarily of non-public open space. The Kings Park Sporting Precinct is home to the Moses Mabhida Stadium which opened in 2009 and is a venue for the 2010 FIFA World Cup, as well as a range of other sporting venues and facilities. North of the precinct is the Windsor Mashie Golf Course and the Durban Country Club. The southern section of the suburb, on the coast at Battery Beach, is home to Water World and the Suncoast Casino and Entertainment World.

Gallery

References

 

Suburbs of Durban